Phillip Gibbons, formerly of Intel Labs Pittsburgh, is a professor in the Computer Science Department and the Electrical & Computer Engineering Department at Carnegie Mellon University.

Gibbons was named a Fellow of the Institute of Electrical and Electronics Engineers (IEEE) in 2014 for his contributions to parallel computing and databases.

References 

Fellow Members of the IEEE
Living people
Year of birth missing (living people)
American electrical engineers